Ardagysh (Ärźägeş) is a rural locality (a village) in Shtandinsky Selsoviet, Baltachevsky District, Bashkortostan, Russia. The population was 37 as of 2010. There is 1 street.

Geography 
Ardagysh is located 21 km northeast of Starobaltachevo (the district's administrative centre) by road. Shtandy is the nearest rural locality.

References 

Rural localities in Baltachevsky District